Contigliano is a  (municipality) in the Province of Rieti in the Italian region of Latium, located about  northeast of Rome and about  west of Rieti.

Contigliano borders the following municipalities: Casperia, Colli sul Velino, Cottanello, Greccio, Montasola, Rieti.

The most important church in town is the church of San Michele Arcangelo. Among the other churches, is the church of Sant'Antonio, San Lorenzo, and the Abbey of San Pastore.

Transport 
Contigliano has a station on the Terni–Sulmona railway, with trains to Terni, Rieti and L'Aquila.

References

External links
 Official website

This link includes genealogical information about some of the families of Contigliano.
 https://www.castelnuovodiportogenealogy.com/

Cities and towns in Lazio